Lucie Moncion (born October 25, 1958) is a Canadian banker, who was appointed to the Senate of Canada on October 30, 2016. She sits in the Senate as an independent, representing the province of Ontario.

Prior to her appointment, Moncion was president and chief executive officer of the Alliance des caisses populaires de l’Ontario, a network of 12 caisses populaires serving Northern Ontario, and served on the boards of Nipissing University, Collège Boréal and Direction Ontario.

References

External links 
 

1958 births
Canadian senators from Ontario
Independent Canadian senators
Women members of the Senate of Canada
Women in Ontario politics
Canadian women chief executives
Franco-Ontarian people
People from North Bay, Ontario
Living people
21st-century Canadian politicians
21st-century Canadian women politicians
Independent Senators Group